The Molten Acentec is the official match ball for the 2019 AFC Asian Cup tournament.

Design
Molten Corporation, which is known for designing volleyball and basketball balls, was chosen by the United Arab Emirates, the host of the tournament, to design the ball. It was the first time ever that Molten was chosen for a football tournament.

According to the Company, Molten will supply match balls designed specially for the AFC Asian Cup utilizing the basic design of Molten’s flagship model Vantaggio 5000 Premier football.

References

2019 AFC Asian Cup
AFC Asian Cup balls